Gábor Gerstenmájer [born 13 September 1967) is a Romanian footballer of German swabian descent who was born in Satu Mare. He won the Romanian Golden Boot award in 1992 while playing for Dinamo.  Following his success with Dinamo a move to Swiss Super League took place and he played there until his retirement.

International career
Gábor Gerstenmájer played three games at international level for Romania, making his debut under coach Mircea Rădulescu, in a friendly which ended with a 1–0 loss against Greece. His following game was a 5–1 victory against Wales at the 1994 World Cup qualifiers. Gerstenmájer's last game for the national team was a friendly which ended with a 2–0 victory against Mexico.

Honours

Club
Dinamo București
 Liga I: 1991–92
Lucerne
 Swiss Challenge League: 1992–93

Individual
Divizia A Golden Boot : 1991–92

References

External links
 
 

1967 births
Living people
Sportspeople from Satu Mare
Romanian footballers
Romania international footballers
FC Olimpia Satu Mare players
FC Brașov (1936) players
FC Dinamo București players
FC Luzern players
FC Schaffhausen players
FC Winterthur players
FC Baden players
Liga I players
Liga II players
Romanian expatriate footballers
Expatriate footballers in Switzerland
Romanian expatriate sportspeople in Switzerland
Romanian people of German descent
FC Frauenfeld players
Association football midfielders
Romanian football managers
Romanian expatriate football managers
Expatriate football managers in Switzerland
FC Baden managers